"Aston Martin Truck" is a song by American rapper Roddy Ricch, released on October 21, 2022, as the second single from his third mixtape Feed Tha Streets III (2022). It was produced by Teddy Walton, Aaron Bow and Byrd.

Composition
Over a "glimmering" beat, Roddy Ricch raps about his wealth and resulting lifestyle in the song, expressing gratitude for it, and also mentioning his love for lean and taking aim at his haters, presumably rapper Lil Uzi Vert in particular.

Music video
The music video was directed by 20K and released alongside the single. In it, Roddy Ricch boards a private jet, spends time in the streets of Queens, hangs out with a dirtbike crew, and shops for jewelry. Throughout the video, he also shows off his diamond jewelry.

Charts

References

2022 singles
2022 songs
Roddy Ricch songs
Songs written by Roddy Ricch
Songs written by Teddy Walton
Atlantic Records singles